The bishop of Table Bay is a suffragan bishop in the Anglican Diocese of Cape Town. Since 2020 the incumbent has been the Right Reverend  Joshua Louw. Like the bishop of Dover the incumbent is in effect the diocesan bishop as his or her superior is primate of an ecclesiastical province.

According to the canons of the Anglican Church of Southern Africa, the bishop of Table Bay has the rights and powers of a diocesan bishop, and is responsible for the day-to-day running of the Diocese of Cape Town.

List of bishops
 Garth Counsell 2004–2020
 Joshua Louw 2020–present

Notes

Lists of Anglican bishops and archbishops
Western Cape-related lists